{{Infobox football club season
 | club              = Bournemouth
 | season            = 2012–13
 | manager           = Paul Groves (until 12 October)Eddie Howe (from 12 October)
 | chairman          = Eddie Mitchell and Maxim Demin
 | stadium           = Dean Court
 | league            = League One
 | league result     = 2nd(promoted) | cup1              = FA Cup
 | cup1 result       = Third round(knocked out by Wigan Athletic)
 | cup2              = League Cup
 | cup2 result       = First round(knocked out by Oxford United)
 | cup3              = League Trophy
 | cup3 result       = First round(knocked out by Portsmouth)
 | league topscorer  = Brett Pitman (20)
 | season topscorer  = Brett Pitman (20)
 | highest attendance= 
 | lowest attendance = 
 | average attendance= 
 | prevseason        = 2011–12
 | nextseason        = 2013–14
}}
The 2012–13 AFC Bournemouth season' saw the club compete in League One where they finished in second place gaining promotion to the 2013–14 Football League Championship. In the League Cup they were knocked out to Oxford United in the first round. In the FA Cup they reached the third round where they drew away to Wigan Athletic the result ended 1–1 which required a reply. In the reply at home Bournemouth lost 1–0 and were knocked out of the competition. Bournemouth also completed in the League Trophy and in the first round they were drawn away against Portsmouth. The match finished 2–2 and required a shoot-out, the Cherries lost 4–3 on penalties.

Season squad

Kit

|
|
|

Competitions

League One

Results summary

 Results per matchday 

Matches

 

FA Cup

League Cup

League Trophy

Statistics

|-
!colspan="14"|Players who are currently on loan:|-
!colspan="14"|Players who have left the club''

|}

Goalscorers

Disciplinary record

Transfers

In

Loans in

Out

Loans Out

References

AFC Bournemouth seasons
AFC Bournemouth